Terrilactibacillus is a genus of bacteria from the family of Bacillaceae with one known species (Terrilactibacillus laevilacticus). Terrilactibacillus laevilacticus has been isolated from soil in Thailand.

References

Bacillaceae
Bacteria genera
Monotypic bacteria genera